Monir Al Badarin (born 8 July 2005) is a professional footballer who plays as a midfielder for Bulgarian club Botev Plovdiv. Born in Bulgaria, he represents Palestine internationally.

Club career
Al Badarin was born in Stara Zagora, Bulgaria. He started his youth career at an early age at Rozova Dolina Kazanlak, before playing four years for Beroe Stara Zagora and one year for Beroe Stara Zagora. After a short stay at Pirin Blagoevgrad, Al Badarin was signed by Botev Plovdiv.

His performances at the youth level caught the attention of senior head coach Azrudin Valentić, who called him up to the winter camp with the first team. On 1 February 2022, Al Badrin signed his first professional contract with Botev Plovdiv. He became a regular for the reserve team, before making his debut with the first team on 22 May 2022, in the last match of the 2021–22 First League season against Slavia Sofia.

International career
Born in Bulgaria, Monir is also eligible to Palestine at the international level due to his origins. He was called up for Bulgaria U17 team in April 2021. In July 2022, he joined Palestine U20 and made his debut on 17 July, scoring a goal in a friendly match against Oman U20. He scored once again on 26 July, in a match against Sudan U20.

Style of play 
Al Badrin can play as either a midfielder or forward.

Career statistics

References

External links
 

2005 births
Living people
Sportspeople from Stara Zagora
Bulgarian people of Palestinian descent
Bulgarian footballers
Palestinian footballers
Association football midfielders
Botev Plovdiv players
First Professional Football League (Bulgaria) players
Palestine youth international footballers